For Love and Honor is a 2007 Turkish drama film, written by Yavuz Turgul and directed by Ömer Vargı, starring Şener Şen as a retired gangster who learns that he has a son in need of protection.

Plot
Ali Osman is a retired Kabadayı (old school gangster) who learns that he has a son Murat. Murat works in a bar and his girlfriend Karaca also works there as a singer. Murat has a run-in with a Mob Boss named Devran who tries to shut down the place. From that moment on, Devran swears to avenge Murat and Karaca and it is up to Ali Osman to protect them.

Cast
Şener Şen as Ali Osman, A retired gangster who learn that he has a son
Kenan İmirzalıoğlu as Devran, Main Villain, mob boss and informant for police. In love with Karaca
İsmail Hacıoğlu as Murat, Ali Osman's son. In love with Karaca
Aslı Tandoğan as Karaca, Singer, in love with Murat
Rasim Öztekin as Sürmeli, Ali Osman`friend
Ruhi Sarı as Selim
Süleyman Turan as Cemil
Ulgar Manzakoğlu as Boss, Villain, Devran boss
Tarık Ünlüoğlu as Gölge

Reception
It was watched by 920,000 in the first 10 days of its release and by over 2 million people in Turkey at the end its theatrical run.

References

External links
Official site

Films set in Turkey
Films set in Istanbul
2007 films
2000s Turkish-language films
2007 crime drama films
2000s crime action films
Films about organized crime in Turkey
Turkish action films
Turkish crime drama films
Gangster films
Turkish films about revenge
Turkish vigilante films
2000s vigilante films